Obstetrics & Gynecology is a peer-reviewed medical journal in the field of obstetrics and gynecology. It is the official publication of the American College of Obstetricians and Gynecologists. It is popularly known as the "Green Journal".

Obstetrics & Gynecology has approximately 45,000 subscribers. According to the 2014 Journal Citation Reports, it had an impact factor of 4.982, ranking it 5th among 82 reproductive medicine journals.

References 

Monthly journals
English-language journals
Lippincott Williams & Wilkins academic journals
Publications established in 1953
Obstetrics and gynaecology journals